The men's 3000 metres event  at the 1999 IAAF World Indoor Championships was held on March 5.

Results

References
Results

3000
3000 metres at the World Athletics Indoor Championships